Hor was an Egyptian pharaoh of the 13th Dynasty.

Hor may also refer to:

People 
 Hor (high steward), an Ancient Egyptian official
 Hor Nambora (born 1957), Cambodian diplomat
 Hor Namhong (born 1935), Cambodian diplomat
 Isaac Hor (born 1946), Malaysian artist
 Hor, a fourth century Christian martyr; see Hor, Besoy, and Daydara
 Hor, a martyr of the Coptic Church; see Hor and Susia
 A Hokkien romanization of the surname He (surname)

Places 
 Hor, Tibet
 Mount Hor, two mountains listed in the Bible
 Mount Hor (Vermont), USA
 River Hor, England
 Horley railway station, a railway station in Surrey, England

Other uses 
 Horus or Hor, an ancient Egyptian deity
 Horo language, an extinct language of Chad
 Hooven-Owens-Rentschler, a manufacturer of steam and diesel engines
 Hor, abbreviation for Horologium (constellation)
 HOR, IATA airport code for Horta Airport, serving Horta, Portugal

Masculine given names